Catha is a genus of plants of the family Celastraceae. It was described by Scottish botanist George Don in 1832.

Species
Three species of the genus are accepted.
 Catha abbottii (A.E.van Wyk & M.Prins)
 Catha edulis (Vahl) Forssk. ex Endl., most commonly known as khat
 Catha transvaalensis (Codd)

References

 
Celastrales genera